Craig McEwan may refer to:

Craig McEwan (footballer) (born 1977), Scottish footballer
Craig McEwan (boxer) (born 1982), Scottish boxer